Little Anna and the Tall Uncle is a children's book series written by Inger & Lasse Sandberg. The first book was published in 1964. The main characters are Anna, a little girl, and Långa farbrorn, a tall man.

Books
 1964 - Vad Anna fick se
 1965 -  Lilla Anna och trollerihatten
 1965 -  Vad lilla Anna sparade på
 1966 -  Lilla Annas mamma fyller år
 1966 -  När lilla Anna var förkyld
 1971 -  Lilla Anna och långa farbrorn på havet
 1972 -  Lilla Annas julklapp
 1972 -  Var är lilla Annas hund?
 1973 -  Lilla Anna flyttar saker
 1973 -  Lilla Anna leker med bollar
 1973 -  Lilla Anna - kom och hjälp
 1975 -  Lilla Anna i glada skolan
 1976 -  Var är långa farbrorns hatt
 1979 -  Lilla Anna och de mystiska fröna
 1982 -  Lilla Anna reser till landet mittemot
 1987 -  Lilla Anna räddar Oskar
 1990 -  Grattis lilla Anna (compilation volume with  Vad Anna fick se, Lilla Anna och trollerihatten and  Lilla Annas mamma fyller år)
 2008 -  Lilla Anna och lilla Långa farbrorn

See also
 The Little Ghost Godfrey

References

Swedish children's book series
Swedish children's literature
Book series introduced in 1964